Poplar-Cotton Center is a census-designated place (CDP) in Tulare County, California, United States. The population was 2,470 at the 2010 census, up from 1,496 at the 2000 census.

Geography
Poplar-Cotton Center  is located at  (36.053936, -119.144796).

Demographics

2010
The 2010 United States Census reported that Poplar-Cotton Center had a population of 2,470. The racial makeup of Poplar was 1,729 (70.0%) White, 1 (0.0%) African American, 15 (0.6%) Native American, 356 (14.4%) Asian, 0 (0.0%) Pacific Islander, 327 (13.2%) from other races, and 42 (1.7%) from two or more races. Hispanic or Latino of any race were 1,809 persons (73.2%).

The Census reported that 2,470 people (100% of the population) lived in households, 0 (0%) lived in non-institutionalized group quarters, and 0 (0%) were institutionalized.

There were 576 households, out of which 366 (63.5%) had children under the age of 18 living in them, 308 (53.5%) were opposite-sex married couples living together, 121 (21.0%) had a female householder with no husband present, 77 (13.4%) had a male householder with no wife present.  There were 76 (13.2%) unmarried opposite-sex partnerships, and 9 (1.6%) same-sex married couples or partnerships. 48 households (8.3%) were made up of individuals, and 27 (4.7%) had someone living alone who was 65 years of age or older. The average household size was 4.29.  There were 506 families (87.8% of all households); the average family size was 4.48.

The population was spread out, with 958 people (38.8%) under the age of 18, 285 people (11.5%) aged 18 to 24, 616 people (24.9%) aged 25 to 44, 411 people (16.6%) aged 45 to 64, and 200 people (8.1%) who were 65 years of age or older.  The median age was 24.8 years. For every 100 females, there were 104.3 males.  For every 100 females age 18 and over, there were 100.5 males.

The homeowner vacancy rate was 1.9%; the rental vacancy rate was 5.1%.  1,132 people (45.8% of the population) lived in owner-occupied housing units and 1,338 people (54.2%) lived in rental housing units.

2000
As of the census of 2000, there were 1,496 people, 349 households, and 314 families residing in the CDP. The racial makeup of the CDP was 29.55% White, 1.60% Native American, 16.71% Asian, 0.40% Pacific Islander, 48.66% from other races, and 3.07% from two or more races. Hispanic or Latino of any race were 59.69% of the population.

There were 349 households, out of which 57.0% had children under the age of 18 living with them, 64.8% were married couples living together, 18.1% had a female householder with no husband present, and 10.0% were non-families. 9.5% of all households were made up of individuals, and 4.9% had someone living alone who was 65 years of age or older.  The average household size was 4.27 and the average family size was 4.46.

In the CDP, the population was spread out, with 40.4% under the age of 18, 11.2% from 18 to 24, 25.2% from 25 to 44, 15.5% from 45 to 64, and 7.6% who were 65 years of age or older.  The median age was 24 years. For every 100 females, there were 108.6 males.  For every 100 females age 18 and over, there were 99.8 males.

The median income for a household in the CDP was $24,519, and the median income for a family was $25,446. Males had a median income of $22,011 versus $19,306 for females. The per capita income for the CDP was $8,605.  About 27.7% of families and 31.2% of the population were below the poverty line, including 41.0% of those under age 18 and 16.5% of those age 65 or over.

Politics
In the state legislature Poplar-Cotton Center is located in the 16th Senate District, represented by Democrat Dean Florez, and in the 30th Assembly District, represented by Republican Danny Gilmore.

In the United States House of Representatives, Poplar-Cotton Center is in

References

Census-designated places in Tulare County, California
Census-designated places in California